Strathkelvin Railway Path is rail trail following the route of several dismantled railway lines extending from Gartcosh to Strathblane. It goes for 10 km from one end to another

History

The northern section follows the route of the Campsie Branch of the Edinburgh and Glasgow Railway which was extended as the Blane Valley Railway line and closed in 1951 (although some parts of the line were still used for freight into the '60s). The southern section follows a branch of the Monkland and Kirkintilloch Railway. Starting in Kirkintilloch it runs south and currently terminates at the northern tip of Gartcosh; just before the original railway junction would have split east to Bedlay Colliery and south to Glenboig.

Future Plans

It has been announced by Sustrans that the path will become part of the National Cycle Network and called route 755. In the future it is planned that the path will be extended to the north further following the route of the dismantled railway to incorporate part of the West Highland Way towards Drymen where it will link to National Cycle Network no. 754 (Forth & Clyde Canal) and National Cycle Network no. 7. To the south there are plans to continue the path to Drumpellier Country Park and then the Monkland Canal where it will link to National Cycle Network no. 75 in Coatbridge.

See also 

 National Cycle Network
 List of rail trails
 List of National Cycle Network routes

References

External links
 Sustran Glasgow & West Central Scotland maps
 Strathkelvin Railway Path (North) 
 Strathkelvin Railway Path (South)

National Cycle Routes
Cycleways in Scotland
Rail trails in Scotland
Footpaths in East Dunbartonshire
Footpaths in North Lanarkshire
Footpaths in Stirling (council area)